Ansgarius is a lunar impact crater that is located near the eastern limb of the Moon. When viewed from the Earth, the crater has a highly oval shape due to foreshortening, but the rim is actually nearly circular. To the northwest of Ansgarius is the crater La Pérouse, and south is Behaim.

The rim of Ansgarius is not significantly worn, and has a terraced interior surface. The southwest rim appears somewhat flattened rather than round, and intrudes into an older formation of which little remains except the western rim. There is an outward notch in the north-northeastern wall. The interior floor of Ansgarius is relatively flat, with only tiny craterlets to mark the surface. Ansgarius was named after Saint Ansgar, a 9th-century Benedictine missionary monk who brought Catholicism to northern Germany and Scandinavia, known as the "Apostle of the North".

Satellite craters
By convention these features are identified on lunar maps by placing the letter on the side of the crater midpoint that is closest to Ansgarius.

References

External links
 

Impact craters on the Moon